Arthur Freed (September 9, 1894 – April 12, 1973) was an American lyricist and Hollywood film producer. He won the Academy Award for Best Picture twice, in 1951 for An American in Paris and in 1958 for Gigi. Both films were musicals. In addition, he produced and was also a co-lyricist for the film Singin' in the Rain.

Early life
Freed was born to a Jewish family in Charleston, South Carolina, and wrote poetry while a high schooler at Phillips Exeter Academy. After graduating in 1914, he began his career as a song-plugger and pianist in Chicago. After meeting Minnie Marx, he sang as part of the act of her sons, the Marx Brothers, on the vaudeville circuit, and also wrote material for the brothers.

He soon began to write songs, and was eventually hired by Metro-Goldwyn-Mayer. For years, he wrote lyrics for numerous films, many set to music by Nacio Herb Brown.

Career
In 1939, after working (uncredited) in the role of associate producer on The Wizard of Oz, he was promoted to being the head of his own unit within MGM, and helped elevate the studio to the leading creator of film musicals. His first solo credit as producer was the film version of Rodgers and Hart's smash Broadway musical Babes in Arms (also 1939), released only a few months after The Wizard of Oz. It starred Mickey Rooney and Judy Garland, and it was so successful that it ushered in a long series of "let's put on a show" "backyard" musicals, all starring Rooney and Garland.

Freed brought talent from the Broadway theaters to the MGM soundstages including Vincente Minnelli, Betty Comden, Adolph Green, Roger Edens, Kay Thompson, Zero Mostel, June Allyson, Nancy Walker, Charles Walters, orchestrators Conrad Salinger, Johnny Green, Lennie Hayton, and others including Shirley Temple. Shirley was signed by MGM for her comeback; the studio made plans to team her with Judy Garland and Mickey Rooney for the Andy Hardy series. However, upon meeting with Arthur Freed for a preliminary interview, the MGM producer exposed his genitals to her, telling Temple "I have something made just for you." When this elicited nervous giggles in response, Freed threw her out and ended their contract before any films were produced.

He also helped shape the careers of stars including Gene Kelly, Frank Sinatra, Red Skelton, Lena Horne, Jane Powell, Esther Williams, Kathryn Grayson, Howard Keel, Cyd Charisse, Ann Miller, Vera-Ellen, and others. He brought Fred Astaire to MGM after Astaire's tenure at RKO and coaxed him out of semi-retirement to star with Garland in Easter Parade. His team of writers, directors, composers and stars produced a steady stream of popular, critically acclaimed musicals until the late 1950s.

He allowed his directors and choreographers free rein, something unheard of in those days of committee-produced film musicals, and is credited for furthering the boundaries of film musicals by allowing such moments in films as the fifteen-minute ballet at the end of An American in Paris (1951), after which the film concludes moments later with no further dialogue or singing, and he allowed the musical team of Lerner and Loewe complete control in their writing of Gigi (1958).

According to Hugh Fordin's book The World of Entertainment, however, Freed did have a hand in the stage-to-screen adaptation of at least one of MGM's musicals, the 1951 Technicolor remake of Kern and Hammerstein's stage classic, Show Boat. It was Freed who disagreed with the original structure of the show's second act, in which more than twenty years pass between most of the act and the final three scenes of the musical. He felt that it made for a lack of drama in the story, and so, together with screenwriter John Lee Mahin, Freed hit upon the idea of having the gambler Gaylord Ravenal leave his wife Magnolia while both are still young and Magnolia is expecting a baby, and then having Julie, the half-black actress who is forced to leave the boat because of her mixed-race background, be the person who brings Ravenal and Magnolia back together again after a separation of only a few years rather than twenty. Also, Freed cast Ava Gardner in the role of Julie.

Two of his films won the Academy Award for Best Picture: An American in Paris and Gigi. On the night that An American in Paris won Best Picture, Freed received an Honorary Oscar, and his version of Show Boat was also up for two Oscars that year, though it lost both to An American in Paris. It is important to note that the year 1951, in which Freed won the Academy Award for Best Picture for Paris was the first year that the Academy of Motion Picture Arts and Sciences nominated producers by name rather than by studio. He was the only person nominated for An American in Paris, thus being the first person in the history of the award to win by name rather than by studio. Singin' in the Rain (1952), now his most highly regarded film, won no Oscars. He was inducted into the Songwriters Hall of Fame in 1972.

Allegations of child sexual abuse
Shirley Temple Black wrote in her 1988 autobiography that when aged eleven she was interviewed by Freed with a view to transferring her career to MGM. She wrote that during the interview, Freed unzipped his trousers and exposed himself to her. "Being innocent of male anatomy, she responded by giggling, and he threw her out of his office", said the actress's obituary. She also reported this on Larry King Live when interviewed on October 25, 1988, citing it as the reason she left MGM after only one film and returned to Fox.

Retirement and later years
Freed left MGM in 1961. He served as president of the Academy of Motion Picture Arts and Sciences until leaving in 1966. He died of a heart attack on April 3, 1973.

Hit songs

With Nacio Herb Brown

With others 
 "I Cried for You" (with Gus Arnheim and Abe Lyman)
 "Our Love Affair" (with Roger Edens)
 "This Heart of Mine" (with Harry Warren)
 "There's Beauty Everywhere" (with Harry Warren)
 "Here's to the Girls" (with Roger Edens)

Producing credits 

 The Wizard of Oz (1939) (associate producer)
 Babes in Arms (1939)
 Strike Up the Band (1940)
 Little Nellie Kelly (1940)
 Lady Be Good (1941)
 Babes on Broadway (1941)
 Panama Hattie (1942)
 For Me and My Gal (1942)
 Cabin in the Sky (1943)
 Best Foot Forward (1943)
 Du Barry Was a Lady (1943)
 Girl Crazy (1943)
 Meet the People (1944) (executive producer)
 Meet Me in St. Louis (1944)
 The Clock (1945)
 Yolanda and the Thief (1945)
 The Harvey Girls (1946)
 Ziegfeld Follies (1946)
 Till the Clouds Roll By (1946)
 Good News (1947)
 Summer Holiday (1948)
 The Pirate (1948)
 Easter Parade (1948)
 Words and Music (1948)
 Take Me Out to the Ball Game (1949)
 The Barkleys of Broadway (1949)
 Any Number Can Play (1949)
 On the Town (1949)
 Annie Get Your Gun (1950)
 Crisis (1950)
 Pagan Love Song (1950)
 Royal Wedding (1951)
 Show Boat (1951)
 An American in Paris (1951)
 The Belle of New York (1952)
 Singin' in the Rain (1952)
 The Band Wagon (1953)
 Brigadoon (1954)
 It's Always Fair Weather (1955)
 Kismet (1955)
 Invitation to the Dance (1956)
 Silk Stockings (1957)
 Gigi (1958)
 Bells Are Ringing (1960)
 The Subterraneans (1960)
 The Light in the Piazza (1962)

References

External links 

 
 SHoF page on Arthur Freed
 Full list of Freed's songs on SHoF site
 
 
 Arthur Freed – Filmography – The New York Times
 Arthur Freed recordings at the Discography of American Historical Recordings

1894 births
1973 deaths
Musicians from Charleston, South Carolina
Jewish American songwriters
Songwriters from South Carolina
Presidents of the Academy of Motion Picture Arts and Sciences
American film producers
American musical theatre lyricists
Broadway composers and lyricists
Vaudeville performers
Academy Honorary Award recipients
Burials at Hillside Memorial Park Cemetery
Businesspeople from Charleston, South Carolina
Producers who won the Best Picture Academy Award
20th-century American businesspeople
20th-century American Jews